Hesdigneul may refer to two communes in the Pas-de-Calais department in northern France:
 Hesdigneul-lès-Béthune
 Hesdigneul-lès-Boulogne